The World Chess Championship 1984–1985 was a match between challenger Garry Kasparov and defending champion Anatoly Karpov in Moscow from 10 September 1984 to 15 February 1985 for the World Chess Championship title. After 5 months and 48 games, the match was abandoned in controversial circumstances with Karpov leading 5 wins to 3 (with 40 draws), and replayed in the World Chess Championship 1985.

1982 Interzonals
Three Interzonal tournaments were held. The top two finishers in each qualified. Zoltán Ribli won the Las Palmas Interzonal ahead of 61-year-old former World Champion Vasily Smyslov. Kasparov, aged 19 years old at the time, won the Moscow Interzonal by a convincing 1½ point margin ahead of Alexander Beliavsky. The Toluca Interzonal was won jointly by Lajos Portisch and Eugenio Torre.

{| class="wikitable"
|+ July 1982 Interzonal, Las Palmas
|-
! !! !! Rating !! 1 !! 2 !! 3 !! 4 !! 5 !! 6 !! 7 !! 8 !! 9 !! 10 !! 11 !! 12 !! 13 !! 14 !! Total !! Tie break
|- style="background:#cfc;"
| 1 || align=left| || 2580 || – || 1 || ½ || 1 || ½ || ½ || 1 || ½ || ½ || ½ || ½ || 1 || 1 || ½ || 9 ||
|- style="background:#cfc;"
| 2 || align=left| || 2565 || 0 || – || 1 || 0 || ½ || ½ || ½ || ½ || 1 || 1 || 1 || ½ || 1 || 1 || 8½ ||
|-
| 3 || align=left| || 2525 || ½ || 0 || – || 0 || ½ || 1 || 1 || 1 || ½ || 1 || 1 || ½ || 1 || 0 || 8 ||
|-
| 4 || align=left| || 2555 || 0 || 1 || 1 || – || 1 || ½ || ½ || 0 || 1 || ½ || 0 || ½ || ½ || 1 || 7½ || 48.00
|-
| 5 || align=left| || 2605 || ½ || ½ || ½ || 0 || – || 1 || ½ || ½ || ½ || 1 || ½ || 1 || ½ || ½ || 7½ || 47.00
|-
| 6 || align=left| || 2600 || ½ || ½ || 0 || ½ || 0 || – || ½ || 1 || 1 || ½ || 0 || ½ || ½ || 1 || 6½ || 39.25
|-
| 7 || align=left| || 2595 || 0 || ½ || 0 || ½ || ½ || ½ || – || 0 || 0 || ½ || 1 || 1 || 1 || 1 || 6½ || 37.50
|-
| 8 || align=left| || 2550 || ½ || ½ || 0 || 1 || ½ || 0 || 1 || – || 0 || ½ || ½ || ½ || ½ || ½ || 6 || 39.25
|-
| 9 || align=left| || 2540 || ½ || 0 || ½ || 0 || ½ || 0 || 1 || 1 || – || 0 || 1 || ½ || 0 || 1 || 6 || 36.00
|-
| 10 || align=left| || 2615 || ½ || 0 || 0 || ½ || 0 || ½ || ½ || ½ || 1 || – || ½ || ½ || ½ || 1 || 6 || 35.00
|-
| 11 || align=left| || 2505 || ½ || 0 || 0 || 1 || ½ || 1 || 0 || ½ || 0 || ½ || – || ½ || ½ || ½ || 5½ || 35.25
|-
| 12 || align=left| || 2360 || 0 || ½ || ½ || ½ || 0 || ½ || 0 || ½ || ½ || ½ || ½ || – || ½ || 1 || 5½ || 32.75
|-
| 13 || align=left| || 2500 || 0 || 0 || 0 || ½ || ½ || ½ || 0 || ½ || 1 || ½ || ½ || ½ || – || 1 || 5½ || 31.25
|-
| 14 || align=left| || 2590 || ½ || 0 || 1 || 0 || ½ || 0 || 0 || ½ || 0 || 0 || ½ || 0 || 0 || – || 3 ||
|}

{| class="wikitable"
|+ September 1982 Interzonal, Moscow
|-
! !! !! Rating !! 1 !! 2 !! 3 !! 4 !! 5 !! 6 !! 7 !! 8 !! 9 !! 10 !! 11 !! 12 !! 13 !! 14 !! Total !! Tie break
|- style="background:#cfc;"
| 1 || align=left| || 2675 || – || ½ || ½ || ½ || ½ || ½ || 1 || 1 || 1 || 1 || 1 || 1 || 1 || ½ || 10 ||
|- style="background:#cfc;"
| 2 || align=left| || 2620 || ½ || – || 1 || ½ || 1 || 1 || 0 || 0 || 1 || 1 || 0 || 1 || ½ || 1 || 8½ ||
|-
| 3 || align=left| || 2610 || ½ || 0 || – || ½ || ½ || ½ || 1 || ½ || ½ || 1 || 1 || ½ || 1 || ½ || 8 || 48.00
|-
| 4 || align=left| || 2610 || ½ || ½ || ½ || – || 0 || ½ || 1 || ½ || ½ || ½ || 1 || 1 || ½ || 1 || 8 || 47.50
|-
| 5 || align=left| || 2565 || ½ || 0 || ½ || 1 || – || ½ || ½ || 0 || 1 || 1 || ½ || ½ || 1 || ½ || 7½ || 46.50
|-
| 6 || align=left| || 2500 || ½ || 0 || ½ || ½ || ½ || – || 1 || 1 || 0 || 1 || 1 || ½ || 0 || 1 || 7½ || 45.25
|-
| 7 || align=left| || 2500 || 0 || 1 || 0 || 0 || ½ || 0 || – || 1 || ½ || ½ || ½ || ½ || 1 || 1 || 6½ ||
|-
| 8 || align=left| || 2560 || 0 || 1 || ½ || ½ || 1 || 0 || 0 || – || ½ || ½ || 0 || ½ || ½ || 1 || 6 || 37.50
|-
| 9 || align=left| || 2505 || 0 || 0 || ½ || ½ || 0 || 1 || ½ || ½ || – || 0 || ½ || ½ || 1 || 1 || 6 || 34.25
|-
| 10 || align=left| || 2495 || 0 || 0 || 0 || ½ || 0 || 0 || ½ || ½ || 1 || – || ½ || 1 || 1 || ½ || 5½ ||
|-
| 11 || align=left| || 2520 || 0 || 1 || 0 || 0 || ½ || 0 || ½ || 1 || ½ || ½ || – || ½ || 0 || ½ || 5 || 31.25
|-
| 12 || align=left| || 2535 || 0 || 0 || ½ || 0 || ½ || ½ || ½ || ½ || ½ || 0 || ½ || – || 1 || ½ || 5 || 29.25
|-
| 13 || align=left| || 2415 || 0 || ½ || 0 || ½ || 0 || 1 || 0 || ½ || 0 || 0 || 1 || 0 || – || 1 || 4½ ||
|-
| 14 || align=left| || 2520 || ½ || 0 || ½ || 0 || ½ || 0 || 0 || 0 || 0 || ½ || ½ || ½ || 0 || – || 3 ||
|}

Tal and Andersson contested a playoff in Malmö for a reserve spot for the Candidates Tournament. The match ended 3–3; Tal became first reserve because of his better tie break score in the main event, but eventually no reserves were needed.

{| class="wikitable"
|+ 1982 Interzonal, Toluca
|-
! !! !! Rating !! 1 !! 2 !! 3 !! 4 !! 5 !! 6 !! 7 !! 8 !! 9 !! 10 !! 11 !! 12 !! 13 !! 14 !! Total !! Tie break
|- style="background:#cfc;"
| 1 || align=left| || 2625 || – || ½ || 1 || ½ || 0 || ½ || 0 || 1 || 1 || 1 || ½ || 1 || 1 || ½ || 8½ || 51.75
|- style="background:#cfc;"
| 2 || align=left| || 2535 || ½ || – || ½ || 0 || ½ || 1 || 1 || ½ || ½ || ½ || 1 || ½ || 1 || 1 || 8½ || 51.00
|-
| 3 || align=left| || 2610 || 0 || ½ || – || ½ || ½ || ½ || ½ || ½ || ½ || 1 || 1 || 1 || ½ || 1 || 8 ||
|-
| 4 || align=left| || 2505 || ½ || 1 || ½ || – || ½ || ½ || ½ || ½ || ½ || ½ || 1 || ½ || 0 || 1 || 7½ || 48.00
|-
| 5 || align=left| || 2555 || 1 || ½ || ½ || ½ || – || ½ || ½ || ½ || ½ || 0 || ½ || 1 || ½ || 1 || 7½ || 46.00
|-
| 6 || align=left| || 2610 || ½ || 0 || ½ || ½ || ½ || – || 1 || ½ || ½ || ½ || ½ || ½ || 1 || 1 || 7½ || 44.50
|-
| 7 || align=left| || 2595 || 1 || 0 || ½ || ½ || ½ || 0 || – || 0 || 1 || 1 || ½ || ½ || 1 || 1 || 7½ || 44.25
|-
| 8 || align=left| || 2565 || 0 || ½ || ½ || ½ || ½ || ½ || 1 || – || ½ || ½ || ½ || ½ || ½ || 1 || 7 ||
|-
| 9 || align=left| || 2555 || 0 || ½ || ½ || ½ || ½ || ½ || 0 || ½ || – || 1 || 0 || 1 || ½ || 1 || 6½ || 38.00
|-
| 10 || align=left| || 2510 || 0 || ½ || 0 || ½ || 1 || ½ || 0 || ½ || 0 || – || 1 || ½ || 1 || 1 || 6½ || 36.75
|-
| 11 || align=left| || 2495 || ½ || 0 || 0 || 0 || ½ || ½ || ½ || ½ || 1 || 0 || – || ½ || ½ || 1 || 5½ ||
|-
| 12 || align=left| || 2415 || 0 || ½ || 0 || ½ || 0 || ½ || ½ || ½ || 0 || ½ || ½ || – || ½ || 0 || 4 || 27.00
|-
| 13 || align=left| || 2480 || 0 || 0 || ½ || 1 || ½ || 0 || 0 || ½ || ½ || 0 || ½ || ½ || – || 0 || 4 || 26.75
|-
| 14 || align=left| || 2440 || ½ || 0 || 0 || 0 || 0 || 0 || 0 || 0 || 0 || 0 || 0 || 1 || 1 || – || 2½ ||
|}

1983–1984 Candidates tournament
The six Interzonal qualifiers were joined by Viktor Korchnoi and Robert Hübner, the Candidates finalists from the previous cycle (World Chess Championship 1981). The eight players participated in a series of knockout matches. The winner was Garry Kasparov.

The Smyslov–Hübner match was originally tied at 5–5. After playing four extra games without breaking the tie, the match was resolved by a spin of the roulette wheel.

Controversies
Politics threatened Kasparov's semi-final match against Viktor Korchnoi, which was scheduled to be played in Pasadena, California. Korchnoi had defected from the Soviet Union in 1976, and was at that time the strongest active non-Soviet player. Various political manoeuvres prevented Kasparov from playing Korchnoi in the United States, and Kasparov forfeited the match. This was resolved when Korchnoi agreed for the match to be replayed in London, along with the Vasily Smyslov vs. Zoltán Ribli match. The Korchnoi–Kasparov match was put together on short notice by Raymond Keene. Kasparov lost the first game, but subsequently won four, prevailing in the match with a total score of 7–4.

1984–1985 Championship match

{| class="wikitable" style="text-align:center"
|+World Chess Championship Match September 1984 – February 1985: Games 1-24
|-
! !! Rating !! 1 !! 2 !! 3 !! 4 !! 5 !! 6 !! 7 !! 8 !! 9 !! 10 !! 11 !! 12 !! 13 !! 14 !! 15 !! 16 !! 17 !! 18 !! 19 !! 20 !! 21 !! 22 !! 23 !! 24 
|-
| align=left |  Anatoly Karpov || 2700
| ½ ||style="background:black; color:white"| ½ || 1 ||style="background:black; color:white"| ½ || ½ ||style="background:black; color:white"| 1 || 1 ||style="background:black; color:white"| ½ || 1 ||style="background:black; color:white"| ½ || ½ ||style="background:black; color:white"| ½ || ½ ||style="background:black; color:white"| ½ || ½ ||style="background:black; color:white"| ½ || ½ ||style="background:black; color:white"| ½ || ½ ||style="background:black; color:white"| ½ || ½ ||style="background:black; color:white"| ½ || ½ ||style="background:black; color:white"| ½ 
|-
| align=left |  Garry Kasparov || 2710
|style="background:black; color:white"| ½ || ½ ||style="background:black; color:white"| 0 || ½ ||style="background:black; color:white"| ½ || 0 ||style="background:black; color:white"| 0 || ½ ||style="background:black; color:white"| 0 || ½ || style="background:black; color:white"| ½ || ½ ||style="background:black; color:white"| ½ || ½ ||style="background:black; color:white"| ½ || ½ ||style="background:black; color:white"| ½ || ½ ||style="background:black; color:white"| ½ || ½ || style="background:black; color:white"| ½ || ½ ||style="background:black; color:white"| ½ || ½ 
|}

{| class="wikitable" style="text-align:center"
|+World Chess Championship Match September 1984 – February 1985: Games 25-48
|-
! !! Rating !! 25 !! 26 !! 27 !! 28 !! 29 !! 30 !! 31 !! 32 !! 33 !! 34 !! 35 !! 36 !! 37 !! 38 !! 39 !! 40 !! 41 !! 42 !! 43 !! 44 !! 45 !! 46 !! 47 !! 48 !! colspan=2|Wins !! Total
|-
| align=left |  Anatoly Karpov || 2700
| ½ || style="background:black; color:white"| ½ || 1 ||style="background:black; color:white"| ½ || ½ ||style="background:black; color:white"| ½ || ½ ||style="background:black; color:white"| 0 || ½ ||style="background:black; color:white"| ½ || ½ || style="background:black; color:white"| ½ || ½ ||style="background:black; color:white"| ½ || ½ ||style="background:black; color:white"| ½ || ½ ||style="background:black; color:white"| ½ || ½ ||style="background:black; color:white"| ½ || ½ ||style="background:black; color:white"| ½ || 0 ||style="background:black; color:white"| 0 || colspan=2 | 5 || 25
|-
| align=left |  Garry Kasparov || 2710
| style="background:black; color:white"| ½ || ½ ||style="background:black; color:white"| 0 || ½ ||style="background:black; color:white"| ½ || ½ ||style="background:black; color:white"| ½ || 1 ||style="background:black; color:white"| ½ || ½ || style="background:black; color:white"| ½ || ½ ||style="background:black; color:white"| ½ || ½ ||style="background:black; color:white"| ½ || ½ || style="background:black; color:white"| ½ || ½ ||style="background:black; color:white"| ½ || ½ ||style="background:black; color:white"| ½ || ½ ||style="background:black; color:white"| 1 || 1  || colspan=2 | 3 || 23
|}

The championship match between Karpov and Kasparov had many ups and downs, and a very controversial finish. Karpov started in very good form, and after nine games Kasparov was down 4–0 in a "first to six wins" match. Fellow players predicted he would be whitewashed 6–0 within 18 games.

But Kasparov dug in and battled Karpov to 17 successive draws. He lost game 27, then fought back with another series of draws until game 32, his first-ever win against the World Champion. Another 14 successive draws followed, through game 46. The previous record length for a world title match had been 34 games, the 1927 match between José Capablanca and Alexander Alekhine, which also followed the "first to 6 wins" format. Games 47 and 48 were both won by the challenger, making the score 5–3 in favor of Karpov and the eventual outcome far less certain.

Then the match was ended without result by Florencio Campomanes, the President of the World Chess Federation, and a new match was announced to start a few months later. The termination was controversial, as both players stated that they preferred the match to continue. Announcing his decision at a press conference, Campomanes cited the health of the players, which had been strained by the length of the match (5 months: 10 September 1984 to 8 February 1985).

The restarted match (the World Chess Championship 1985) was best of 24, with the champion (Karpov) to retain his title if the match was tied 12–12. Because Karpov's two-point lead from the 1984 match was wiped out, Karpov was granted the right of a return match (the World Chess Championship 1986) if he lost.

The 1984 match became the first, and so far only, world championship match to be abandoned without result. Karpov would later say that, if he had won this match 6-0, Kasparov would never have become world champion, because he was too emotional. On the other hand, Raymond Keene felt that Kasparov showed "an astonishing buoyancy and resilience of spirit".

Notes

References

External links
Edward Winter, The Termination (1988, updated in 2005, 2007, and 2008)

1984
1984 in chess
Chess in Russia
Chess in the Soviet Union
1984 in Russian sport
1984 in Soviet sport
1984 in Moscow
Sports competitions in Moscow
1985 in chess
1985 in Russian sport
1985 in Soviet sport
1985 in Moscow
Garry Kasparov